The animal name changes in Turkey is the revision of taxonomic nomenclature of three subspecies by the Turkish Ministry of Environment and Forestry. The name changes removed references to Armenia and Kurdistan in the taxonomic nomenclature of subspecies of each animal.

History and reaction
The declared taxonomic nomenclature for the three subspecies is effective for the Turkish Environment and Forestry Ministry. According to a statement released by the same ministry on March 4, 2005, the original names were divisive and contradicted "Turkish unity".

Some Turkish officials have said that the original taxonomic nomenclature was intended in bad faith to imply that Armenians and Kurds resided in the areas where the animals lived. However, only the scientific names of the animals were changed.

Andrew Polaszek, the executive secretary of the International Commission on Zoological Nomenclature, the organization responsible for establishing species naming conventions, has said in an interview that acceptance of the revised names would depend upon article publications in scientific journals, but that they were otherwise acceptable from a scientific viewpoint.

Revised taxonomic nomenclature

These changes currently affect only official taxonomic nomenclature usage by the Turkish Government.

See also
International Code of Zoological Nomenclature
Place name changes in Turkey
Anti-Armenian sentiment in Turkey
Turkification
Turkish nationalism

References

Fauna of Turkey
Fauna of Europe
Anti-Armenianism in Turkey
Anti-Kurdish sentiment
Environment of Turkey
Linguistic purism
Turkish language
Turkish nationalism
Society of Turkey
Xenophobia
Zoological nomenclature